

Season Review

Coaching staff
{|class="wikitable"
|-
!Position
!Staff
|-
|Coach||  Fabiano Jose Flora
|-
|rowspan="1"|Assistant coach||  U Myo Tun
|-
|Technical manager||  U Nyam Win
|-
|Goalkeeper coach|| U Myo Chit
|-
|Manager|| U Soe Moe
|-

Other information

|-

Squad(2016)

Transfers

In:

Out:

References

Zeya Shwe Myay FC

External links
 First Eleven Journal in Burmese
 Soccer Myanmar in Burmese
 Official Zayashwemye FC website in Burmese

Zayar Shwe Myay